Michael J. Weithorn is an American writer, director, and producer whose works include the long-running sitcom The King of Queens.

Early life
Weithorn was raised first in the Fresh Meadows neighborhood of the New York City borough of Queens, and then in Port Washington, New York, on Long Island. He graduated Swarthmore College in Swarthmore, Pennsylvania in 1978 with a Bachelor of Arts degree in political science.

Career
After arriving in Los Angeles and teaching high school for three years, Weithorn's first major writing opportunity was an episode of the television series Benson in 1981. In 1982 he passed up an opportunity to become part of the original writing staff of Late Night With David Letterman to work with producer Gary David Goldberg on Goldberg's new series Family Ties. From 1982 to 1986 Weithorn was a story consultant and then producer on 102 episodes of Family Ties, writing 26 of the episodes during his tenure on the show.  During that same time, he also wrote episodes for other TV shows, including Cheers. He worked for Ubu Productions until 1986, when he founded Hanley Productions with a contract at 20th Century Fox Television and ABC.

He began creating TV series of his own after leaving Family Ties in 1986, including The Pursuit of Happiness (1987), True Colors (1990-1992), South Central (1994) and Ned and Stacey (1995-1997).

In 1998, he created The King of Queens with David Litt. The show ran until 2007, when Weithorn wrote the hour-long finale episode, "China Syndrome".

In 2006, he co-created (with Nick Bakay) the Comedy Central animated web series The Adventures of Baxter and McGuire, an episode of which was also shown at the Sundance Film Festival.

In 2010, he wrote and directed the feature film A Little Help, which stars Jenna Fischer, Chris O'Donnell and Rob Benedict.

In 2015, Weithorn created and executive produced the short-lived Fox midseason sitcom Weird Loners, starring Becki Newton and Zachary Knighton.

Awards

Weithorn has five Emmy nominations. In 1984, he was nominated for an Emmy for his work on Family Ties along with the show's other producers. One year later, he was nominated again for Family Ties, both times in the category of Outstanding Comedy Series. In 1986, Weithorn was nominated for two Emmys for Family Ties, one for producing and the other for Outstanding Writing in a Comedy Series. In 1989, he was nominated for another Writing Emmy for his work on the TV series The Wonder Years. In 2007, he was nominated for a Daytime Emmy for "Best Outstanding Broadband Program – Comedy" for The Adventures of Baxter and McGuire. In 2010, Weithorn's film A Little Help was the winner of best feature at several major film festivals.

Weithorn won a Writers Guild of America award in 1985 for his work on an episode of Cheers.

Filmography

References

External links

American male screenwriters
American television directors
Television producers from New York City
American television writers
Living people
Place of birth missing (living people)
1956 births
Writers Guild of America Award winners
Swarthmore College alumni
Writers from Queens, New York
Showrunners
American male television writers
Film directors from New York City
Screenwriters from New York (state)